"My Sunshine" is a song by Australian duo Mashd N Kutcher and was released in December 2015. The song samples Len's "Steal My Sunshine". 

The song was the most played song on Australian Radio in February 2016.

Track listings
1 track single
 "My Sunshine" - 2:54

Remixes
 "My Sunshine" (Generik remix) - 4:39
 "My Sunshine" (Tigerlily remix) - 4:52
 "My Sunshine" (Matt Watkins remix) - 4:15

Charts

Weekly charts

Year-end charts

Certifications

References

2015 singles
2015 songs
Australian songs
Mashd N Kutcher songs
Songs written by Gregg Diamond
Song recordings produced by Mashd N Kutcher